Epiblema expressana is a species of moth of the family Tortricidae. It is found in China (Jilin, Heilongjiang), Japan, Russia and Korea.

References

Moths described in 1882
Eucosmini